This page is a list of the various personnel and line-ups that have been a part of the English rock band the Who, from their origin as the Detours in 1962 to the present day. Founding members Roger Daltrey and Pete Townshend have been the band's only constant members throughout its history.

Personnel

Members 
Current members

Former members

Touring members 
Current touring members

Former touring members

Session musicians

Timeline

Official members

Touring members timeline

Line-ups

References

External links
List of every concert performed by The Who, including the personnel for each concert

 
Who, The